CIDE-FM is a Canadian First Nations radio station belonging to the Wawatay Native Communications Society, broadcasting at 91.9 FM in Sioux Lookout, Ontario. The station broadcasts distance education and informational programming through the Northern Nishnawbe Education Council. CIDE-FM has an extensive network of rebroadcasters throughout Northwestern Ontario.

Rebroadcasters

CIDE's retransmitters always use the same 91.9 FM frequency as the originating station in Sioux Lookout. Transmitters are located in the following communities:

 CIDE-FM-1 Bearskin Lake
 CIDE-FM-2 Big Trout Lake
 CIDE-FM-3 Cat Lake
 CIDE-FM-4 Deer Lake
 CIDE-FM-5 Fort Severn
 CIDE-FM-6 Kasabonika
 CIDE-FM-7 Kingfisher Lake
 CIDE-FM-8 Lac Seul
 CIDE-FM-9 Muskrat Dam
 CIDE-FM-10 North Spirit Lake
 CIDE-FM-11 New Osnaburgh
 CIDE-FM-12 Pikangikum
 CIDE-FM-13 Poplar Hill
 CIDE-FM-14 Sachigo Lake
 CIDE-FM-15 Sandy Lake
 CIDE-FM-16 Slate Falls
 CIDE-FM-17 Wapekeka
 CIDE-FM-18 Weagamow Lake
 CIDE-FM-19 Wunnummin Lake
 CIDE-FM-20 Webequie
 CIDE-FM-21 Keewaywin

External links
Decision CRTC 92-712

Ide
Ide
Distance education in Canada
Sioux Lookout
Year of establishment missing